This is a list of major Orthodox Jewish yeshivos in Europe before World War II. During the war, most of the yeshivos were forced to close, never being reopened in Europe afterwards, as Orthodox Judaism in Europe, specifically in Eastern Europe, had practically been destroyed or uprooted by the Nazis or Soviets. However, many of the students or roshei yeshiva survived the war, and reestablished their yeshivos in the United States and Israel, where Eastern European Jewry had resettled.

References

Citations

Bibliography 

Lists of schools in Europe
Lists of religious schools
Pre-World War II
 
Europe,Pre-World War II